The Angas, Angas–Sura, or Central West Chadic languages (also known as A.3 West Chadic) are a branch of West Chadic languages spoken in Plateau State, north-central Nigeria.

Languages
The Angas languages are:

Angas
Ngasic: Ngas (Angas), Belnəng; ?Miler
Mwaghavulic: Mwaghavul, Mupun (Mapun), Takas (Toos); Cakfem-Mushere
Miship (Chip)
Pan cluster
Chakato; Jorto (spurious)
Jipal, Mernyang (Mirriam), Kwagallak, Kofyar (Doemak), Bwol, Goram, Jibyal
Nteng
Tel (Tɛɛl, Montol)
Talic: Tal, Pyapun, Koenoem
Goemaic: Goemai
Yiwom (Ywom, Gerka)

Note that in the language names, orthographic oe stands for the mid central vowel ə, a practice that had been adopted by missionaries in the Shendam area during the 1930s, such as Father E. Sirlinger.

Unlike many other West Chadic languages, Angas languages do not have complex nominal and verbal morphology.

Ywom is the most divergent language.

Phonology
Some phonological characteristics that are typical of the Chadic A3 languages:
Palatalised consonants
Implosive consonants ɓ, ɗ
Six-vowel system consisting of i, ɨ, u, ɛ, ɔ, a
Three tone levels

Morphology
The West Chadic A3 languages have isolating morphology due to typological convergence with the Plateau languages. Blench (2022) notes that there are many morphological similarities with Berom, Izere, and Ninzic languages (such as Mada), although there are no immediately identifiable direct lexical borrowings. Although Hausa and the West Chadic A3 languages share many lexical cognates, Hausa is much more morphologically complex. This is because Hausa originated from outside the Plateau area and had thus not undergone intensive long-term contact with Plateau languages to the extent that West Chadic A3 had.

Plurals are marked with an *mV- affix throughout West Chadic A3 languages.

Lexicon
The West Chadic A3 languages are lexically innovative, having lost many common Chadic lexical roots as with the Ron and South Bauchi languages. Blench (2022) suggests that this is due to borrowing from Plateau languages that have since become extinct and/or assimilated.

Names and locations
Below is a comprehensive list of Angas language names, populations, and locations from Blench (2019).

References

West Chadic languages
Languages of Nigeria